The Rocky Mountain Lacrosse League (RMLL) is a box lacrosse league based in Alberta with three teams in Saskatchewan and, as of 2018, one in Manitoba. It is sanctioned by the Alberta Lacrosse Association. RMLL organizes all senior and junior play in the province. The league is broken into several divisions: Senior B, Senior C, Junior A, Junior B, Tier II and Tier III. Junior Ladies and Senior Ladies divisions were added in 2004 and 2011, respectively.

The RMLL is experiencing rapid growth as the popularity of box lacrosse increases, spurred on by the expansion of the National Lacrosse League to Calgary in 2001 and Edmonton in 2005. In 2002, 18 teams played in the RMLL at all levels. That number grew to 37 in 2005, then 59 in 2006. An all-time high 64 teams competed in 2016.

National championships
The RMLL is guaranteed at least one berth in each of the following national championship tournaments. Championship teams from Alberta are listed:

Presidents Cup 

1975 - Edmonton Fullers
1983 - Calgary Mountaineers
2002 - Edmonton Outlaws
2007 - Sherwood Park Outlaws
2016 - St. Albert Miners
2017 - St. Albert Miners
2018 - St. Albert Miners

Minto Cup 

none

Founders Cup 

1980 - Enoch Tomahawks
1999 - Edmonton Miners
2009 - Calgary Mountaineers
2019 - Calgary Shamrocks

The RMLL currently is not eligible for the Mann Cup Senior A championship. However, the Calgary Chinooks won the Mann Cup in 1914.

Champions

Teams

References

External links 
 
Ridley Scouting RMLL history website

Sport in Alberta
Lacrosse leagues in Canada